NGC 3357 is an elliptical galaxy located in the constellation of Leo. It was discovered on April 5, 1864 by German astronomer Albert Marth.

References

External links
 
 

Leo (constellation)
18640305
Elliptical galaxies
3357
032032